Wilts & Dorset is a bus and coach operator providing services in East Dorset, South Wiltshire, and West Hampshire. It operates services under the morebus brand around Bournemouth and Poole, and under the Salisbury Reds brand around Salisbury and Amesbury. It is part of Go South Coast, a subsidiary of the Go-Ahead Group.

The current bus company has operated since 1983. Wilts & Dorset was also the name of a former Salisbury-based bus company from 1915 until 1972.

History

1915 to 1972 
Wilts & Dorset Motor Services Limited was incorporated in 1915, with its head office in Amesbury, Wiltshire, moving to Salisbury in 1917. The company's first route was between Salisbury and Amesbury. The company grew rapidly in the Andover, Amesbury, Blandford Forum, Pewsey and Salisbury areas. The Southern Railway and Thomas Tilling obtained shares in 1931, with Wilts & Dorset being nationalised in 1948. It acquired Venture of Basingstoke in 1950, in a reorganisation following the nationalisation of Venture's parent, Red & White. Wilts & Dorset acquired Silver Star of Porton Down, Wiltshire in June 1963.

Despite the name, the company's operations were mainly in the southern part of Wiltshire and the northern part of Hampshire.

In 1963 the management of Wilts & Dorset passed to Hants & Dorset, a neighbouring state-owned bus company. In 1969 both companies became part of the National Bus Company and in October 1972, they were merged under the Hants & Dorset name with the Wilts & Dorset name ceasing to be used.

1983: re-establishment
The Transport Act 1985 led to the privatisation of the National Bus Company. In preparation for privatisation, in April 1983 Hants & Dorset was split into three operating companies, one of which was Wilts & Dorset Bus Company.

The new Wilts & Dorset company's operating area was considerably larger than its older namesake, including Swanage, Poole, Bournemouth, Lymington, Devizes, Swindon, and Salisbury, although not Basingstoke. Depots were at Blandford Forum, Lymington, Pewsey, Poole, Ringwood, Salisbury, and Swanage.

1987: privatisation
In June 1987 Wilts & Dorset was sold in a management buyout. The new company fought off competition from Charlie's Cars and Badger Vectis.

In May 1993 Damory Coaches of Blandford Forum was purchased, followed in November 1993 by Oakfield Travel and Stanbridge & Crichel Bus Company, and in January 1994 by Blandford Bus Company. All were combined under the Damory Coaches name.

2003: purchase by Go-Ahead 
On 11 August 2003 the business was sold to the Go-Ahead Group. It is now part of the subsidiary Go South Coast.

Coach companies Tourist Coaches, Levers, and Kingston Coaches were purchased and consolidated under the Tourist Coaches name; and in 2003 Bell's Coaches were added.

On 31 July 2008, a W&D open-top bus collided with two cars between Studland and the local chain ferry, injuring 30 people. The bus, a route 50 service travelling from Swanage to Bournemouth, collided with both a Volkswagen Golf and a Porsche, the latter of which was driving away from the chain ferry on Ferry Road and crashed head on with the bus and the other car. A number of passengers reported the bus travelled a distance on two wheels, and the eventual toppling took place at low speed. The top-deck passengers were all thrown off onto soft ground in a ditch. Six passengers were taken to Poole Hospital with minor injuries. The driver of the Porsche was later convicted of driving without due care and attention.

In 2011, Wilts & Dorset trialled Go-Ahead Group's "The Key" smartcard ticketing system similar to London's Oyster Card and the ITSO ticket used on National Rail services, which was already in use by sister companies Brighton and Hove and Metrobus. In 2012 it was launched across the entire network, with passengers able to save up to 33% against purchasing paper tickets.

In 2014, it was announced that the bus station on Endless Street, Salisbury, would close in favour of town centre stops. The station had opened in 1939 as the headquarters of Wilts & Dorset.

2012: rebranding
In July 2012 it was announced that the Wilts & Dorset name would be dropped from bus services in favour of the morebus brand in Poole and Bournemouth, and Salisbury Reds in Salisbury and Amesbury.

Dorset operations (morebus)

morebus 

Morebus operates bus services within Bournemouth, Poole and Christchurch areas formerly under the Wilts & Dorset name.

The brand was launched in December 2004 as a premium service replacing routes 101 to 105 between Poole, Bournemouth, and Christchurch, and routes 155, 156, and 157 between Poole and Canford Heath. The service launched with 30 Wright Eclipse bodied Volvo B7RLE single-deck buses. The buses carried a livery of mostly dark blue with red at the back; the original 30 also carried slogans such as "looks like a bus, works like a dream".

Such was the success of the 'more' services, the frequency on the m1 and m2 routes was increased and the m1 extended to the Castlepoint shopping centre on the outskirts of Bournemouth from Bournemouth railway station. With only 30 'more' branded buses in the fleet at the time, the 'more' branded routes to Canford Heath were discontinued, with the 'm' dropped from the route number and standard liveried vehicles used. For these routes to become 'more' routes again, a batch of Mercedes-Benz Citaros were ordered. The original 'more' buses were going to be Citaros, but it had been thought that Volvo would offer a quicker delivery time. Further changes to the routes occurred on 25 May 2008, with the m2 being withdrawn from Burton (transferred to Route X12 which was later withdrawn also) and Somerford to terminate at Boscombe.

During 2010, the 'more' brand was refreshed with every bus being repainted in a slightly brighter, simpler version of the previous livery, each highlighting a good reason for using the 'more' buses; for example "morefrequent" was applied to Wright Volvo Eclipse 119 (now 2219) HF54 HGM.

In May 2011, routes m5 and m6 were once again dropped from the 'more' brand and renumbered as routes 5 and 6.

In June 2012, Wilts & Dorset announced a £5.5 million investment in 36 Wright Eclipse bodied Volvo buses to be used on the m1 and m2 routes whilst the previous 38 Volvos and Citaros would be cascaded onto other services, replacing older buses. Also at this time, routes 8 and 9 became part of the 'more' brand.

Following the decision by the administrators of Yellow Buses to cease all bus operations in August 2022, morebus took over several routes including the airport service.

In 2023, morebus announced a £7.7 million investment in 28 Alexander Dennis Enviro400 MMC buses.

Nightbus
On 30 May 2008, the more 'Nightbus' sub-brand launched with m1 operating every half-hour between Poole Bus Station and Charminster (Five Ways), and m2 operating every half-hour between Bournemouth Square and Iford Roundabout on Friday and Saturday nights.

During June 2010, the m1 nightbus was extended beyond the Five Ways to the Broadway Tavern, a few minutes up Charminster Road. May 2011 saw the m2 nightbus route changed beyond Pokesdown to serve Southbourne (Fisherman's Walk). Between June 2012 and February 2013, a third nightbus route connected Bournemouth to Bournemouth University.

In April 2020, both nightbus services were withdrawn as a result of the COVID-19 pandemic.

University services

Morebus operates four routes on behalf of Bournemouth University and Arts University Bournemouth. During the summer of 2016, the services were rebranded as 'Unibus', with new Alexander Dennis Enviro 400 MMC's arriving in a new livery, all with different colour schemes. These buses have WiFi and USB chargers, which passengers can use at no extra cost. A new route 17 was also launched, which connects the university with Bournemouth and Poole via the railway stations.

From 2004, when the university contract was transferred to Wilts & Dorset from Yellow Buses, until the end of 2009, services were branded as Unilinx and operated by a mixed fleet of double-deck buses (Optare Spectras and brand-new Volvo B7TL ELC Myllennium Vyking convertibles) painted in a modified version of the 'more' livery. Unilinx-branded buses were also a common sight on non-Unilinx services, especially on service 152 (later the 52) where ELC Myllennium Vyking buses ran open-top throughout the summer.

In 2009, when the university contract was renewed, eight buses (of which six were Scania Enviro 400 double deckers) were used on the U1, U2 and U4 routes, with a Scania Solar single deck bus on the U3 route. These were purchased new, while an ex-London articulated Mercedes-Benz Citaro bus was introduced to route U1 on 10 January 2010, primarily running a shuttle service to boost capacity between Talbot Campus and the student residences at Lansdowne. It was believed to be the first such bus in service on the South Coast, and initially had its route number and destination blinds as part of its livery (including a misspelling of 'Cranborne' as 'Cranbourne') as this bus was used exclusively between Talbot Campus and Cranborne House. From January 2010, these routes were branded as 'The Bus for Bournemouth University' or 'The Bus for BU', with buses appearing in the institution's primary corporate colours of white and pink. For the 2012–2013 academic year, a second articulated bus was acquired.

Apart from the 4 U-prefixed routes operated on behalf of the universities, commercial routes m1, m2, 6/6A, 13, 15 and 17 are also included in the Unibus network.

Cross Country Services
Morebus operates 5 cross country, "X" prefixed bus routes under the brand from Bournemouth & Poole to surrounding towns. These longer-distance bus services stop at every bus stop. 4 routes start from Bournemouth via Wessex Way, including
 X1/X2 to Christchurch, Highcliffe-on-Sea, New Milton and Lymington
 X3 to Ringwood and Salisbury travelling mainly on the A338
 X6 to Ringwood returning to Poole via Verwood and Ferndown.

From Poole, there are 2 express routes, including X6 (see above) and X8 to Blandford via the A350.

Among these routes, X3 also belongs to Salisbury Reds network as well. The X3 used to be a limited stop service, but it now serves every stop on request.

Former Yellow Buses services
As Yellow Buses collapsed in August 2022, morebus has taken over the operation of most of its routes, and offered a £2000 welcome bonus to recruit existing drivers who had a PCV licence. As a result, morebus obtained a monopoly in the bus services across Bournemouth, Christchurch and Poole.

The former Yellow Buses route which morebus operated after its collapse include:

 1, 1b: Bournemouth – Christchurch
 1a: Bournemouth – Somerford
 2: Bournemouth – Royal Bournemouth Hospital – Castlepoint
 4: Bournemouth – Moordown – Castlepoint
 5, 5a: Bournemouth – Kinson
 6, 6a: Bournemouth – Bearwood – Wimborne (6) / Kinson (6a)
 18: Bournemouth – Broadstone
 33: Bournemouth – Christchurch
 36: Talbot View – Kinson
 737: Bournemouth – Bournemouth Airport Terminal

They also run subsidised routes 18, 33 and 36 since February 2023, which were previously contracted to Xelabus under the Yellow Coaches brand.

Wiltshire operations (Salisbury Reds)

Salisbury Reds 

Salisbury Reds operates bus services in the Salisbury and Amesbury areas formerly operated under the Wilts & Dorset name.

Routes X7 and X7R express routes to Southampton are operated by Salisbury Reds as well as the X5 to Swindon via Marlborough.

PulseLine was the name of services around Salisbury to the District Hospital. In 2010 the name was replaced by Salisbury Reds, using the previous Mercedes-Benz Citaros repainted in the revised Wilts & Dorset livery with Salisbury Reds branding. In addition to the Citaros, ex Southern Vectis Dennis Dart MPDs were transferred and repainted into Wilts & Dorset livery with branding applied.

Salisbury Park and Ride

The Salisbury Park and Ride service began operation in March 2001 to one park and ride site, Beehive, to the north of Salisbury city centre. A second site was opened at Wilton in 2005, and two more followed, taking the total to four. A fifth site was later opened at Petersfinger, to the south-east of the city.

Initially, the routes used Optare Excels in a light green and white livery. In 2005, these were replaced by new Volvo B7RLEs, also in green and white; for a short period in late 2004, the service was operated using 'more' branded B7RLEs.

In February 2011 Wilts & Dorset lost the contract to operate the Salisbury Park and Ride network to independent operator Hatts Travel.

In August 2014, due to the collapse of the Hatts group, the park & ride contract was handed back to Salisbury Reds to run for Wiltshire Council.

Activ8
 8: Salisbury – Boscombe Down – Amesbury – Tidworth – Andover
Activ8 is a joint half-hourly service between Salisbury and Andover via Tidworth, operated in partnership with Stagecoach South and supported by Wiltshire and Hampshire County Councils. The brand was launched in February 2007. Wilts & Dorset primarily use specially branded Alexander Dennis Enviro400 MMCs on the route, having previously used Alexander Dennis Enviro400s, Scania OmniCitys and Optare Spectras.

Coach operations and subdivisions 

Coach operations were established by the company in the 1990s when Wilts & Dorset purchased Tourist Coaches of Figheldean, Wiltshire. In Dorset, three acquisitions were made: Damory Coaches in May 1993, Oakfield Travel in November 1993, and Blandford Bus Company in January 1994. The latter three were then combined under the Damory Coaches name. Excelsior Motorways was also purchased following the retirement of its owner in October 2016. Each operation that was purchased became a brand under the company which run public and school routes within its own area.

Damory Coaches 
Damory Coaches operates school bus services as well as some public services primarily within west Dorset such as service X12 to Weymouth via Dorchester from its Blandford Forum depot. In October 2013 it commenced operating the Rossmore Flyer from Alderney to Upper Parkstone, now cascaded into routes 7A, 7B and 7C. Later in 2015, it had purchased five new Optare Solos to run primarily on its local Dorchester services. Damory also operates the X8 from Blandford to Poole alongside morebus.

Tourist Coaches 
Tourist Coaches operates public services within the Wiltshire area from the Salisbury Reds depot. It was founded in 1920 by E & DF Stanfield in Figheldean, Wiltshire. At the time, it provided both private coach hire and contract coach services for the military establishments around Salisbury Plain.

Tourist services

The New Forest Tour 

Circular tourist routes in the New Forest using open-top buses are operated jointly by Bluestar and Wilts & Dorset.

Purbeck Breezer

More operates four all-year services under the Purbeck Breezer brand, with service 40 going from Poole to Swanage via Wareham and Corfe Castle, service 50 being an open-top service that runs from Bournemouth railway station to Swanage via the Sandbanks Ferry, service 60 going from Rockley Park to Sandbanks via Poole and Lilliput and service 70 going from Bournemouth East Cliff to Alum Chine via Westbourne. These services run more frequently in the summer, with summer only services, that, as of 2022, include service 30 from Swanage to Weymouth (and one trip each way to/from Dorchester), service 31, that goes from Wool Rail Station to Lulworth Cove & Durdle Door and route 35, that goes from Swanage to Wareham Forest.

As of summer 2022, more operates the following Purbeck Breezer routes:
 30: Swanage – Dorchester (via Lulworth Cove)
 31: Wool Rail Station – Lulworth Cove & Durdle Door
 35: Swanage – Wareham Forest
 40: Swanage – Poole via Wareham
 50: Swanage – Bournemouth railway station (via Sandbanks Ferry)
 60: Rockley Park – Sandbanks (via Poole)
 70: Bournemouth (East Cliff) – Alum Chine (via Westbourne)

The Stonehenge Tour

The Stonehenge Tour was rebranded in 2008, linking Salisbury railway station, the city centre, and Stonehenge. A recorded commentary describes the views along the length of the route. The tour was operated by Wills & Dorset Optare Spectras, but is now run using a combination of Alexander Dennis Enviro400 MMC and Alexander Dennis Enviro200 MMC vehicles, which have been specially painted in a New Stonehenge Tour Livery.

Former routes

'more' (prior to rebranding) 
 m5: Poole – Canford Heath – Tollerford Road via Oakdale
 m6: Poole – Canford Heath – Tower Park via Oakdale
 m7: Poole – Canford Heath – Nuffield Industrial Estate via Oakdale
The m7 was dropped as part of the Poole route restructuring from 4 June 2006. Service on m5 and m6 increased as a result and a while later, lost their more branding and became standard routes during the changes of 1 May 2011.
 8: Poole – Upton via Oakdale & Creekmoor
 9: Poole – Turlin Moor via Hamworthy
Merged and turned into a circular service (both ways) and joined the 'more' brand on 3 June 2012.

Wimborne Flyer 

 3: Poole – Broadstone – Wimborne/Leigh Park

The Wimborne Flyer, also known as service 3, replaced the Poole to Wimborne section of service 132 after the major restructuring of Poole services in June 2006. It runs four times an hour Monday to Saturday. The service differs from the old service 132 by taking a direct route between Poole and Broadstone, using a faster route through Merley, and extending the service from Wimborne Square to the Leigh Park estate. The service, when launched, was almost exclusively operated by Mercedes-Benz Citaros in the new standard Wilts & Dorset livery, though 'more' Citaros and Wright Eclipse Urbans were also seen.

Local residents criticised the change of route, specifically through Merley where the buses took a narrower but more direct road through the estate. Some criticism has also been aimed at the Citaro buses after a number of accidents, including buses demolishing walls while trying to pass each other on a narrow road and tearing hanging baskets from walls in Wimborne Square while turning. Following numerous complaints, Wilts & Dorset rerouted the service through Merley from 29 October 2006, reverting to part of the old 132 route through Merley Gardens.

From 6 April 2008, two out of the four buses per hour started to run via Corfe Mullen rather than Merley with all services also stopping at Broadstone Broadway. Services to and from Leigh Park only run during the morning and evening peak. With the Wimborne Flyer now covering the section of route between Broadstone and Corfe Mullen, most service 4 journeys started to terminate at Broadstone.

As part of the 3 June 2012 network changes, the 3 was withdrawn and was merged with Route 4, which was extended beyond Broadstone to Wimborne either via Merley or Corfe Mullen. After many complaints, Route 4X was introduced between Poole & Broadstone/Merley via the old Route 3 during the morning and evening rush-hours towards the end of June 2012. Towards the end of July 2012 however, it was announced that Route 3 would be re-instated from 17 September 2012 and that both routes 3 & 4 would join the more brand.

Other withdrawn routes 

 152: Poole – Rockley Park
Route 152 of morebus was withdrawn on 25 May 2019, being replaced by the extension of the Purbeck Breezer Route 60 to Rockley Park.

X8A
Route X8A operated by Damory on behalf of morebus was withdrawn on 13 February 2021.

See also
 List of bus operators of the United Kingdom

References

Further reading

External links

 More website
 Salisbury Reds website

Bus operators in Dorset
Bus operators in Wiltshire
Bus operators in Hampshire
Transport companies established in 1915